Scooby-Doo and the Ghoul School is a 1988 animated made-for-television film produced by Hanna-Barbera for syndication as part of the Hanna-Barbera Superstars 10 series.

Plot
Scooby-Doo, Shaggy, and Scrappy-Doo are on their way to Miss Grimwood's Finishing School for Girls, where they have been hired as gym teachers. However, once there, they find that it is actually a school for daughters of paranormal beings. The pupils include Sibella, the daughter of Count Dracula; Elsa Frankenteen, the daughter of Frankenteen Sr.; Winnie, the daughter of the Wolfman; Phantasma (usually called Phanty for short) the ghostly daughter of a phantom; and Tanis (named after an Egyptian city), the daughter of the Mummy–all inspired by Universal Monsters of the 1930s-40s. Other residents include a floating white hand; an octopus butler; a two-headed shark that lives in the school's moat; Legs, a spider that helps with the upcoming volleyball match; Miss Grimwood, the headmistress; and her diminutive pet dragon Matches. Frightened by this, Shaggy and Scooby are initially hesitant, but they ultimately agree to stay as gym teachers.

The following morning begins with the class and the new teachers taking ballet lessons. At their gym class, the girls for their upcoming volleyball match against the boys of the neighboring Calloway Military Academy. The boys rig the volleyball with a remote control, but because of an accidental squirt of ketchup, the boys lose the remote. Scooby accidentally swallows the remote and allows the girls to win instead.

The girls' fathers come for an open house party on Halloween night. Though Scooby and Shaggy fear being trapped in a house full of ghosts and monsters, the fathers are friendly and polite, and the party is a success. Before leaving, the fathers warn a fearful Shaggy and Scooby not to let any harm come to their daughters, lest they face severe consequences.

A power-hungry witch named Revolta and her minion the Grim Creeper plan to kidnap the girls and make them her slaves. She starts by hypnotizing Shaggy into taking the girls on a field trip to the Barren Bog. Matches wants to come with them but is told to stay. That same day, the Calloway Cadets are at the bog. On a hike, the Cadets are stuck in quicksand but are saved by Elsa and Tanis. Meanwhile, Revolta's spider bats slowly capture the girls one by one. Revolta and the Grim Creeper capture the girls and Revolta makes a potion that will turn them evil forever at the stroke of midnight. Figuring this out, Scooby, Scrappy, Shaggy, and Matches, who catches up with them, head toward Revolta's castle. Scrappy tries to convince the Cadets to join them, but they refuse believing that the girls stole the volleyball match. Arriving at the castle the gang faces an evil Mirror Monster that can change its shape to look like evil versions of those who look at its mirror, a giant Well Dweller, and Revolta herself. When the clock strikes midnight, Revolta gives the girls the potion through hairdryers which instantly takes effect. However, Scooby and Shaggy manage to interrupt the process and accidentally reverse the potion's effect. Elsa then throws Revolta's wand into the potion the witch was brewing, and the castle starts exploding with no way out. At the last second, the Cadets appear in a pedal power helicopter, who feel remorse for treating the girls the way they had in the past and respect them for saving their lives. As everyone flies away, Revolta swears vengeance.

Soon afterward, the Cadets and the Grimwood Girls throw a party celebrating Revolta's defeat and everyone's heroism. Despite being well liked by all their students, Shaggy and Scooby run away in terror when new monsters; such as an alien, the Creature from the Black Lagoon and Godzilla Kaiju enroll their own daughters at the school for the following year. As they leave, they see the girls and Matches wave them goodbye. Shaggy, Scooby and Scrappy then give them a last werewolf howl before driving off into the night.

Voice cast

 Don Messick as Scooby-Doo, Scrappy-Doo
 Casey Kasem as Shaggy
 Susan Blu as Sibella Dracula 
 Remy Auberjonois as Baxter
 Hamilton Camp as Phantom Father
 Jeff B. Cohen as Grunt
 Glynis Johns as Ms. Grimwood
 Zale Kessler as Count Dracula, Frankenteen Sr.
 Ruta Lee as Revolta
 Aaron Lohr as Miguel
 Patty Maloney as Tanis
 Scott Menville as Tug
 Pat Musick as Elsa Frankenteen
 Bumper Robinson as Jamal
 Ronnie Schell as Colonel Calloway
 Marilyn Schreffler as Winnie
 Russi Taylor as "Phanty" Phantasma
 Andre Stojka as The Grim Creeper, Mummy Daddy
 Frank Welker as Matches, Werewolf Father, Well Dweller, Mirror Monster

Home media
Scooby-Doo and the Ghoul School was first released on VHS by Hanna-Barbera Home Video in 1989, and later it was re-released by Warner Home Video in March 2001.

Warner Home Video released Scooby-Doo and the Ghoul School on DVD in Region 1 on June 4, 2002  in honor of the theatrical release of the first live-action Scooby-Doo film later that month. The film has also been released on DVD in Region 2.

Legacy
The five girl ghouls made their return in the OK K.O.! Let's Be Heroes episode "Monster Party", which was first released online on October 1, 2018, and aired on television October 21, 2018. Though Scooby and Shaggy do not appear, they are briefly referenced. While Russi Taylor (as Phantasma), Susan Blu (as Sibella) and Pat Musick (as Elsa Frankenteen) reprise their roles, Natalie Palamides and Kristen Li, (who voiced Buttercup and Bubbles from the 2016 Powerpuff Girls television series), took over for Winnie and Tanis respectively as Marilyn Schreffler had died and Patty Maloney had retired.

Follow-up film
A follow-up film, Scooby-Doo! and the Reluctant Werewolf, was released on November 13, 1988.

References

External links

 

1988 television films
1988 animated films
1988 films
1980s American animated films
1980s children's animated films
1980s monster movies
1980s ghost films
Hanna-Barbera animated films
Scooby-Doo animated films
Hanna–Barbera Superstars 10
Films based on television series
Animated films based on animated series
American children's animated fantasy films
Television films based on television series
American children's animated comedy films
Films directed by Charles August Nichols
Films directed by Ray Patterson (animator)
American comedy horror films
American monster movies
American ghost films
Dracula films
Frankenstein films
Mummy films
Werewolves in animated film
American films about Halloween
Vampires in animated film
Vampires in animated television
Films about witchcraft
Films about hypnosis
Animated films about dragons
American comedy television films
1980s English-language films